Prostiboř is a municipality and village in Tachov District in the Plzeň Region of the Czech Republic. It has about 200 inhabitants.

Administrative parts
The village of Telice and the hamlet of Kopec are administrative parts of Prostiboř.

Notable people
Isaak Löw Hofmann, Edler von Hofmannsthal (1759–1849), Austrian merchant

References

External links

Villages in Tachov District